Thomas Edward Seymour (born January 20, 1977, in New Britain, Connecticut) is an American filmmaker and actor.

Tom Seymour is considered one of the "Top Twenty Contemporary Underground Filmmakers in the U.S.", according to the book The History of Independent Cinema, He is most known for the award-winning documentaries VHS Massacre, VHS Massacre Too, and MacLeod, distributed by FilmRise, NBC/Universal, Tubi, Peacock TV, MUBI, Shudder's Mid May Massacre and Troma Entertainment (2016–2021). The documentaries feature Joe Bob Briggs, James Rolfe, Greg Sestero, Debbie Rochon, Lloyd Kaufman, Juliette Danielle and Kevin MacLeod. They concentrate on the video store era and how media consolidation has destroyed the American exploitation film industry.

Career
VHS Massacre was screened at Yale University in May 2016 as part of the NH docs Film Festival. It was called "A Fantastic Documentary" by Ain't it Cool News. Seymour joined the 26th annual Webby Awards to judge, becoming an Associate Member of the International Academy of Digital Arts and Sciences in October 2021.

In addition he is known for his work on the 2018 National Board of Review-nominated (through Hunter College) Toy Shop and the Emmy-nominated and YouTube Award-nominated series net_work (2007–2009), featured on Hulu. In 2014 Seymour won the Platinum Remi (World-fest Houston's Highest honor) for his feature film Rudyard Kipling's Mark of the Beast. He has accrued over forty film festival wins in his career to date, including at San Francisco IndieFest, Cannes World, Chicago Horror, Vancouver Horror Show, Miami Sci-Fi, Requiem FearFest,and the  Telly Awards. His films have been covered by media including Variety, NPR, and the New York Times.

Seymour has directed video content for CBS, NBC, IGN, Troma, college and Black20 Studios over the course of his career. He is the creator of the popular internet web series Black20: Trailer Park (seen on G4 TV, IGN, YouTube). Black20.com boasts 150,000,000 unique views of their video content and features talent including Aubrey Plaza, Amy Schumer, and Eric Andre. In 2008 Seymour and the rest of the Black20 comedy troop were voted the first "The Kings of Dot Comedy" by Attack of the Show on G4TV.

With Jon Gorman of Bloodbath Pictures, Seymour directed the feature film Rudyard Kipling's Mark of the Beast starring Ellen Muth (Dead Like Me Showtime series) in 2012; it was given a positive review by Ain't it Cool News and was featured in Issue #318 of Fangoria Magazine in the article "Bugged out on Beast".

At Hale Manor Productions, he starred in and directed such films as London Betty (released on Maverick Entertainment's Platinum label in 2010), starring Daniel Von Bargen from Seinfeld and Malcolm in the Middle and narrated by Clint Howard. London Betty made the list of "Top Films of the Year" on Moviesmademe.com in 2009, and in May 2011 it hit the #3 spot for British comedy on Amazon on Demand. Seymour also directed the York Entertainment DVD release bestseller Land of College Prophets and Everything Moves Alone, which had a New York theatrical run in 2001.

Some of his higher profile acting performances include A New Wave (starring John Krasinski), Being Michael Madsen (starring Michael Madsen, Virginia Madsen and David Carradine), the Emmy-nominated Hulu series net_Work as the character "Tom: The Coolest Guy in The Office" and The Tonight Show with Jay Leno in the "Easter Bunny Hates You" digital video.

He also composed the scores for the independent films such as Everything Moves Alone, Thrill Kill Jack in Hale Manor, and Land of College Prophets.

While he acts, directs and writes scripts, he is also a solo musical artist. His first album, U.S. Export was released by Sling Slang Records in 2004 to positive reviews.

Filmography
VHS Massacre (Troma Entertainment)
VHS Massacre Too (Troma Entertainment)
Monster Kill Series (Troma Entertainment)
Rudyard Kipling's Mark of the Beast
A New Wave
Being Michael Madsen
London Betty
Land of College Prophets
Raise Your Voice
The 1 Second Film
Everything Moves Alone
Attack of the Show

Discography
U.S. Export 2003 (Sling Slang Records)
Sky from the Mine 2011 (Hale Manor Productions)

Awards
2022 Cult Critic Movie Awards

References

External links

1977 births
Living people
American rock musicians
American male film actors
American film score composers
American male film score composers
People from New Britain, Connecticut